Karayevia is a genus of diatom belonging to the family Achnanthidiaceae.

The genus was first described by Round and L. Bukhtiyarova in 1996.

Species:
 Karayevia amoena
 Karayevia bottnica
 Karayevia clevei

References

Achnanthales
Diatom genera